El Dorado is a restaurant in Zona Romántica, Puerto Vallarta, in the Mexican state of Jalisco.

Description
Located along Playa de los Muertos, the restaurant serves Mexican cuisine and seafood. Menu options include lobster and bone marrow tacos, stone crab cakes, seared scallops, and New York Strip steak with asparagus wrapped in bacon.

History
Spouses Guillermo Wulff and Nelly Barquet opened El Dorado in 1961. The business was frequented by Elizabeth Taylor, Eva Gardner, Richard Burton, and Rock Hudson.

According to Nathan Aguilera of Fodor's, El Dorado is a "sister restaurant" to La Palapa.

See also

 List of Mexican restaurants
 List of restaurants in Mexico
 List of seafood restaurants

References

External links

 

1961 establishments in Mexico
Mexican restaurants in Mexico
Restaurants established in 1961
Restaurants in Jalisco
Seafood restaurants
Zona Romántica